is a city located in Kanagawa Prefecture, Japan. , the city had an estimated population of 83,709 and a population density of 3800 persons per km².

Geography
Ayase is in the plains of north-central Kanagawa Prefecture along the banks of the Sagami River. The Hikiji River flows through part of the city. More than 18% of the city is occupied by the Naval Air Facility Atsugi (equivalent to about 78% of the total area of the base).

Surrounding municipalities
Kanagawa Prefecture
Ebina
Yamato
Fujisawa

Climate
Ayase has a Humid subtropical climate (Köppen Cfa) characterized by warm summers and cool winters with light to no snowfall.  The average annual temperature in Ayase is 15.2 °C. The average annual rainfall is 1632 mm with September as the wettest month. The temperatures are highest on average in August, at around 25.6 °C, and lowest in January, at around 5.2 °C.

Demographics
Per Japanese census data, the population of Ayase has grown steadily over the past century.

History
In the Edo period, the area of modern Ayase was part of the tenryō territory in Sagami Province controlled directly by the Tokugawa shogunate, but administered through various hatamoto. After the Meiji restoration, the area became part of Kōza District, Kanagawa Prefecture. The village of Ayase was created on April 1, 1889, through the merger of eight small hamlets, and was elevated to town status on April 1, 1945. On November 11, 1978, Ayase became the newest city in Kanagawa Prefecture.

Government
Ayase has a mayor-council form of government with a directly elected mayor and a unicameral city council of 20 members. Ayase contributes one member to the Kanagawa Prefectural Assembly. In terms of national politics, the city is part of Kanagawa 13th district of the lower house of the Diet of Japan.

Economy
Ayase is known for its processed meat industry, and is the leading producer of pork products in Kanagawa Prefecture.

Education
Ayase has ten public elementary schools and five public middle schools operated by the city government. The city has two public high schools operated by the Kanagawa Prefectural Board of Education. There are also two private high schools.

Transportation
Ayase is not connected by rail, although the tracks of the Tōkaidō Shinkansen pass through the city. The nearest train stations are Kashiwadai Station and Sagamino Station (on the Sagami Railway in neighboring Ebina) and Chōgo Station on the Odakyu Enoshima Line in Fujisawa.

Five numbered prefectural highways crisscross the city, but no national highway. The Tōmei Expressway passes through Ayase, but does not have interchange, although there is a highway bus stop for the city.

International relations

Twin towns — Sister cities
Ayase is twinned with:
  Kashiwa, Chiba, Japan (1967)

Notable people from Ayase, Kanagawa
 Ryo Iida, Japanese footballer (FC TIAMO Hirakata, Japanese Regional Leagues - Kansai Soccer League)
 Takashi Ishii - Japanese professional baseball pitcher and coach (Tohoku Rakuten Golden Eagles, Nippon Professional Baseball - Pacific League)
 Yuu Kashii - Japanese actress and model
 Yasumasa Kawasaki - Japanese footballer (SC Sagamihara, J3 League)
 Minoru Kobayashi, Japanese former football player and football manager
 Mirai Shida - Japanese actress
 Taku Suzuki - Japanese comedian and actor

See also 
Naval Air Facility Atsugi

References

External links 

Official Website 

 
Cities in Kanagawa Prefecture